The Electoral district of Scoresby was an electoral district of the Victorian Legislative Assembly. It was first created after the district of Upper Yarra was abolished in 1945. George Knox was the last member for Upper Yarra and the first for Scoresby. The electorate was abolished after a redistribution in 1976, being replaced by the district of Wantirna. Geoff Hayes then became the first member for Wantirna. After the 2002 redistribution, the electorate was replaced, once again returning as the electoral district of Scoresby. The first member for Scoresby, Kim Wells, was also the last member for Wantirna. The seat was again abolished in 2014 and replaced by Rowville.

Members for Scoresby

Election results

See also
 Parliaments of the Australian states and territories
 List of members of the Victorian Legislative Assembly

References

External links
 Electorate profile: Scoresby District, Victorian Electoral Commission

Former electoral districts of Victoria (Australia)
1945 establishments in Australia
1976 disestablishments in Australia
2002 establishments in Australia
2014 disestablishments in Australia